Actaeon Sound is a sound in the Queen Charlotte Strait region of the Central Coast of British Columbia, branching off northeasterly from the north side of Drury Inlet near its head on the mainland of British Columbia to the north of the town of Port McNeill, on the opposite side of Queen Charlotte Strait.

Dove Island sits in the middle of the opening, on the Drury Inlet side.

It is believed to have been named for the gunboat HMS Dove, commanded by Lieut. Cdr James Bullock, which was deployed as tender to HMS Actaeon in the East Indies and Chinese waters in later years.

Name origin
Name adopted in 1865 by Captain Pender as suggested by W. Blakeney, RN, paymaster aboard the Beaver, after his former vessel, HM Actaeon; Blakeney had served aboard the 26-gun frigate Actaeon during the latter's commission in China.....

References

Sounds of British Columbia
Central Coast of British Columbia